Bartosz Piotr Grzelak (born 2 November 1978) is a Swedish football manager who most recently served as the head coach of AIK in Allsvenskan. He is also a former footballer who played as a midfielder.

Playing career 
Grzelak made his sole Allsvenskan appearance for AIK on 26 October 1997 in a 1997 Allsvenskan game against Malmö FF when he replaced Johan Mjällby in the last couple of minutes of the game. He was also a Sweden U19 international, appearing in seven games in 1996.

Managerial career
In 2009 Grzelak became playing assistant manager for IK Frej. He became head coach for the club in 2012.

In June 2017 he joined as assistant manager to Rikard Norling in Allsvenskan side AIK.

In December 2018 he was appointed as assistant manager to the Sweden national under-21 football team.

In July 2020 he was appointed as AIK's new head coach, following the dismissal of Norling.

In August 2022, Grzelak was dismissed as the head coach of AIK after a string of poor performances in August, including a 3-0 defeat against 1. FC Slovácko in the 2022–23 UEFA Europa Conference League play-off round, as well as a 1-0 defeat against Kalmar FF and a 2-2 draw against IFK Värnamo in Allsvenskan.

Managerial statistics

1 Only competitive matches are counted.

Personal life 
He was born in Szczecin, Polish People's Republic, to Polish parents before moving to Sweden at the age of four.

References

1978 births
Living people
Sportspeople from Szczecin
Polish footballers
Polish football managers
Swedish footballers
Swedish football managers
IF Brommapojkarna players
AIK Fotboll managers
AIK Fotboll non-playing staff
Association football midfielders
Allsvenskan managers
Polish emigrants to Sweden
Polish expatriate football managers